Otenabant (CP-945,598) is a drug  which acts as a potent and highly selective CB1 antagonist. It was developed by Pfizer for the treatment of obesity, but development for this application has been discontinued following the problems seen during clinical use of the similar drug rimonabant.

See also
 Cannabinoid receptor antagonist

References

Cannabinoids
Purines
Piperidines
Carboxamides
Chlorobenzenes
Pfizer brands
CB1 receptor antagonists